"Rough Justice" is an episode of the BBC sitcom Porridge. It aired on 4 March 1977. When Judge Rawley's watch is stolen, they hold a kangaroo court with Harris as the suspect.

Synopsis 
The episode opens with Warren visiting Fletcher’s cell wishing to have his love letter written by Rawley instead of Fletcher, as Rawley is an educated man. Fletcher insists on doing the job himself because Rawley is likely to write with sophisticated words. Plus love letters are Fletcher’s forte. Rawley arrives and says he will take up Warren’s suggestion of helping out prisoners' family members with legal issues. However, Rawley refuses to accept any price for this which Fletcher berates him for.

Harris returns from the pig farm, with a horrible smell and a bad mood. The other prisoners mock him for his smell, but Harris is upset because he was relegated to the farm due to Rawley being given a clerical job (and he still carries around a farming aroma even after taking a bath). Fletcher tells Harris to “naff off” before getting to work on Warren’s letter to his wife. Unfortunately, Fletcher writes Rita instead of Elaine as he was thinking about Rita Hayworth. Fletcher decides to cross out Rita and replaces it with Errol Flynn. Just then, Rawley returns to the cell. Rawley comments that Harris was abusive to him, but the others say they will protect Rawley from any more harassment. Rawley then says that he’s grown to like and trust his fellow inmates, until he discovers his watch has been stolen. This causes the others to blame each other until they deduce that Harris was in the cell earlier and he must have taken it, due to his penchant for sneak thievery.

That night, Fletcher persuades Rawley to hold a kangaroo court with Rawley as the judge and Fletcher as the prosecutor. Fletcher reasons he’s been up before court many times to know enough about legal procedure. Rawley is reluctant, but agrees to go ahead.

Next day, they use the boiler room as the court room. Rawley is the judge, Fletcher is the prosecutor, Warren is the defence counsel and Godber is the witness. McClaren is the prisoner escort and roughly drags Harris into the room. Due to the fact Fletcher insisted on a proper enquiry, Rawley notes that the hearsay evidence would not be admissible in court and has no choice but to clear Harris. McClaren offers to extract a confession from Harris and, upon twisting his arm, Harris admits he stole the watch and promises to return it to Rawley.

That evening, Rawley informs Fletcher and Godber he is a free man, as his appeal was successful. During recreation time, Mr Mackay permits Rawley to bid farewell to his former fellow inmates. Rawley thanks the men for accepting him and promises to be more open minded about the penal system. Rawley also gives Fletcher his watch as a parting gift. However, Harris had taken the insides from the watch, rendering it useless. The episode ends with a still of Fletcher angrily throwing the watch in the air.

Porridge (1974 TV series) episodes
1977 British television episodes